Zorko Čanadi (25 July 1925 – 24 August 2003) was a general of the Yugoslav People's Army (JNA).

Biography
In 1943, during World War II in Yugoslavia, Čanadi joined both the Yugoslav Partisans and the League of Communists of Yugoslavia (SKJ). He was promoted to Major General in 1972, Lieutenant General in 1976 and Colonel General in 1982. In the 1970s and the 1980s, he held a number of senior positions in the Yugoslav People's Army (JNA). He was chief of staff and therefore deputy commander of the First Army in 1974–1978, and commander of the Fifth Army in 1980–1985. In 1985–1987, he held the position of the Chief of the General Staff of the JNA. He retired from active military service on 31 December 1987.

References

Literature

Vojni leksikon. „Vojnoizdavački zavod“ Beograd, 1981. godina.

1925 births
2003 deaths
People from Orahovica
Chiefs of Staff of the Yugoslav People's Army
Yugoslav Partisans members
Generals of the Yugoslav People's Army
Central Committee of the League of Communists of Yugoslavia members